Susan Bogosian Laughlin (March 16, 1932 – June 27, 2020) was a Democratic member of the Pennsylvania House of Representatives.

She is a 1950 graduate of Ambridge Area High School. She was first elected to represent the 16th legislative district in the Pennsylvania House of Representatives in 1988, a position she held until her retirement prior to the 2004 elections. Laughlin died on June 27, 2020 at the age of 88.

References

External links
 official PA House profile (archived)
 official Party website (archived)

1932 births
2020 deaths
People from Sewickley, Pennsylvania
Democratic Party members of the Pennsylvania House of Representatives
Women state legislators in Pennsylvania
21st-century American women